Alum Rock is a district of San Jose, California, located in East San Jose. Formerly an independent town, it has been a neighborhood of San Jose since the 1950's, though some portions are still unincorporated as a census-designated place. Alum Rock is one of San Jose's most notable and historic Chicano/Mexican-American districts. It is home to Alum Rock Park, the oldest municipal park in California and one of the largest in the country.

History

Alum Rock was named after a rock formerly thought to be composed of alum in nearby Alum Rock Park.

In the 19th century and early 20th century Alum Rock was mostly fruit orchard land. During the 1940s and 1950s, developers began building housing and formed the community of Alum Rock. During that time, Alum Rock Avenue and a passenger railroad passed through the town on the way to Alum Rock Park.

In the 1980s and 1990s, the neighborhood became older and increasingly populated with Latino immigrants as "white flight" affected the area of East San Jose. Today, Alum Rock remains a distinct community separated from the rest of San Jose.

The magnitude 5.6 Alum Rock earthquake occurred just northeast of the community on October 30, 2007, the strongest to hit the region since the 1989 Loma Prieta earthquake.  No significant damage or injuries were reported.

Geography
Alum Rock is a vast district of East San Jose, made up of numerous smaller neighborhoods. Neighborhoods include Little Portugal, Little Saigon, Mayfair, King & Story, East Foothills, Alum Rock Village, Mount Pleasant, among others.  

Alum Rock is located north of the Evergreen district, south of the Berryessa district, and east of Downtown San Jose. Alum Rock is bound by the Diablo Range to the east, Coyote Creek to the west, Mabury Road to the north and Ocala Avenue to the south.

Demographics
The following demographic data is about the Alum Rock CDP, not the larger Alum Rock district of San Jose.

2010
The 2010 United States Census reported that Alum Rock had a population of 15,536. The racial makeup of Alum Rock was 6,581 (42.4%) White, 207 (1.3%) African American, 298 (1.9%) Native American, 2,039 (13.1%) Asian, 70 (0.5%) Pacific Islander, 5,466 (35.2%) from other races, and 875 (5.6%) from two or more races. Hispanic or Latino of any race were 10,977 persons (70.7%).

The Census reported that 15,364 people (98.9% of the population) lived in households, 66 (0.4%) lived in non-institutionalized group quarters, and 106 (0.7%) were institutionalized.

There were 3,686 households, out of which 1,895 (51.4%) had children under the age of 18 living in them, 2,064 (56.0%) were opposite-sex married couples living together, 621 (16.8%) had a female householder with no husband present, 335 (9.1%) had a male householder with no wife present.  There were 241 (6.5%) unmarried opposite-sex partnerships, and 23 (0.6%) same-sex married couples or partnerships. 444 households (12.0%) were made up of individuals, and 181 (4.9%) had someone living alone who was 65 years of age or older. The average household size was 4.17.  There were 3,020 families (81.9% of all households); the average family size was 4.33.

The population was spread out, with 4,383 people (28.2%) under the age of 18, 1,709 people (11.0%) aged 18 to 24, 4,708 people (30.3%) aged 25 to 44, 3,345 people (21.5%) aged 45 to 64, and 1,391 people (9.0%) who were 65 years of age or older.  The median age was 31.7 years. For every 100 females, there were 105.9 males.  For every 100 females age 18 and over, there were 104.2 males.

The homeowner vacancy rate was 1.8%; the rental vacancy rate was 3.2%.  9,541 people (61.4% of the population) lived in owner-occupied housing units and 5,823 people (37.5%) lived in rental housing units.

2000

As of the census of 2000, there were 13,479 people, 3,345 households, and 2,736 families residing in the CDP. The racial makeup of the CDP was 44.14% White, 2.23% African American, 1.71% Native American, 8.70% Asian, 0.39% Pacific Islander, 36.89% from other races, and 5.94% from two or more races. Hispanic or Latino of any race were 66.99% of the population.

There were 3,345 households, out of which 44.5% had children under the age of 18 living with them, 57.4% were married couples living together, 16.2% had a female householder with no husband present, and 18.2% were non-families. 13.0% of all households were made up of individuals, and 6.2% had someone living alone who was 65 years of age or older.  The average household size was 3.98 and the average family size was 4.17.

In the CDP, the population was spread out, with 30.6% under the age of 18, 10.7% from 18 to 24, 32.5% from 25 to 44, 17.2% from 45 to 64, and 9.1% who were 65 years of age or older.  The median age was 30 years. For every 100 females, there were 105.0 males.  For every 100 females age 18 and over, there were 103.0 males.

The median income for a household in the CDP was $54,567, and the median income for a family was $53,872. Males had a median income of $31,485 versus $28,154 for females. The per capita income for the CDP was $15,359.  About 8.2% of families and 10.9% of the population were below the poverty line, including 9.6% of those under age 18 and 11.8% of those age 65 or over.

Government

Regarding San Jose City Council, most of Alum Rock falls inside of District 5, represented by Magdalena Carrasco, though small portions are inside of District 7 and District 4.

Education

Alum Rock is served by the Alum Rock Union School District for elementary and middle school, while high schools are served by the East Side Union High School District.

Schools in Alum Rock include:
 James Lick High School
 Mt. Pleasant High School
 William C. Overfelt High School 
 Joseph George Middle School
 César Chávez Elementary School
 Linda Vista Elementary School 
 San Antonio Elementary School
 Dorsa Elementary School
 Sheppard Middle School
 McCollam Elementary School
 Escuela Popular - Spanish/English dual immersion school

Parks and plazas

Parks in the Alum Rock district include:
Alum Rock Park
Cimarrón Park
Delano Manongs Park
Emma Prusch Farm Park 
Overfelt Gardens (including the Chinese Cultural Garden)
Mayfair Park
Plata Arroyo Park
Zolezzi Park

Transportation

The Alum Rock Transit Center is an important transit center for East San Jose, operated by the Valley Transportation Authority. It is serviced by bus and light rail.

VTA light rail stations along Capitol Expressway within Alum Rock:
McKee station
Alum Rock station

Penitencia Creek station is located right at the border of Alum Rock and Berryessa.

The Eastridge Expansion of the VTA light rail plans the construction of another light rail station at Story Road and Capitol Expressway.

Both the Bayshore Freeway (US-101) and the Sinclair Freeway (I-680) pass through Alum Rock.

Gallery

References

External links

Alum Rock branch of the San Jose Public Library system
City of San Jose, Council District 5

Census-designated places in Santa Clara County, California
Neighborhoods in San Jose, California
Census-designated places in California
Chicano and Mexican neighborhoods in California